Lev Semyonovich Rubinstein is a Russian poet, essayist, and social activist. He is a founder and member of Moscow Conceptualism.

Biography
Born in Moscow, Rubinstein studied philology at Moscow State University. After graduating, he worked as a librarian and bibliographer with his alma mater, where he encountered the catalog cards that would inspire his "notecard poems". In the 1970s and 1980s, Rubinstein became a major writer in the underground Soviet literary scene, particularly for his association with Moscow Conceptualism. In his later career, Rubinstein transitioned to journalism and social activism, writing for The Itogi and the Weekly Journal. He won the Andrei Bely Prize for scholarship in the humanities in 1999. Today, Rubinstein is married to his wife Irina and has one daughter, Maria.

Work
Rubinstein his known for his "notecard poems", wherein each stanza is represented on a separate notecard. These notecards highlight the text as both an object and a unit of expression. To read the poem, the reader must interact with the text on a physical level. Although each stanza is discrete and numbered, the cards must nonetheless be read in their prescribed order.

Rubinstein’s poems incorporate several forms of literary expression. They move between verse and prose, sometimes adopting the form of a play or even containing cues for the audience. Much of the writing itself is a "quasi-quotation", a quotation that appears to be from everyday life, but is instead carefully constructed with a specific style and meter. Rubenstein often borrows the style of important Russian writers, yet he adapts his own words to this style, hence creating quotations which are not in fact quotations.

Rubinstein is often associated with the Moscow Conceptualists, a Russian artistic movement in which the ideative concept of art supersedes traditional artistic focuses. Rubinstein himself states that "Moscow conceptualism unites the inner feeling that the world is divided, all the texts are written, the paintings are drawn. The task of the current artist is to rethink, to rename. And to name is more important than to do. To a certain extent, it is a nominative art." Moscow Conceptualism is also a negative response to Russian socialist realism, centering on the "consciousness of the individual who has to live this myth" of socialist realism.

Bibliography
Rubinstein's work has been translated in four English-language books:

 Catalog of Comedic Novelties, translated by Philip Metres and Tatiana Tulchinsky (New York: Ugly Duckling Presse, 2004).
 Compleat Catalog of Comedic Novelties, translated by Philip Metres and Tatiana Tulchinsky (New York: Ugly Duckling Presse, 2014).
 Here I Am: New Russian Writing, translated by Joanne Turnbull (Moscow: GLAS, 2001).
 Thirty-five New Pages, translated by Philip Metres and Tatiana Tulchinsky (New York: Ugly Duckling Presse, 2011).

He also has appeared in a number of anthologies. His work has been published in English translation in literary journals such as Asymptote, The Cafe Review, Diode, Drunken Boat, Jacket, The Massachusetts Review, Matter, New England Review, and Poetry International.

Awards
1999: literary Andrei Bely Prize in the nomination Humanitarian Research
2012: literary prize  for his book Signs of Attention

References

External links 
 Complete English bibliography
 Лев Рубинштейн в «Журнальном зале»
 Владислав Кулаков. Минимализм: стратегия и тактика
 Денис Иоффе: Невидимый Готлиб летит над рекой. Интервью со Львом Рубинштейном

1947 births
Living people
Russian male poets
Russian male essayists
Soviet male poets
Russian opinion journalists
Russian male journalists
Moscow State Pedagogical University alumni
Soviet Jews
Russian Jews
Writers from Moscow